Damansara Jaya is a township consisting of Sections SS22 and SS22A of the city of Petaling Jaya in the state of Selangor, Malaysia. It is situated within the Sungai Buloh mukim (subdivision) of the Petaling district. It covers an estimated area of 1.21 km2 (0.467 sq mi) and has an estimated population of 11,678 residents.

The township consists of almost 2000 residential dwellings consisting of 1538 units of terraced houses, 179 semi-detached housing units and 42 bungalows along with a main commercial area. The Atria, originally called the Gardenia Town Centre for a brief period of time, is a shopping mall located in the centre of this commercial area.

Damansara Jaya is also home to KDU College (previously known as Kolej Damansara Utama) and SMK Damansara Jaya, a government co-educational secondary school.

History

Damansara Jaya was developed by Paramount Garden, then a subsidiary of See Hoy Chan Sdn Bhd Group, in the mid-1970s. It originally encompassed just Section SS22 of Petaling Jaya. Section SS22A which mainly consists of bungalows and semi-detached homes was added to Damansara Jaya in the later part of the decade. Construction commenced in 1975 and the early residents of Damansara Jaya first occupied their newly completed double-storey terraced homes in 1978.

In 2007, some 14 units of semi-detached three-storey houses were added to Damansara Jaya. This development was built as Aman Residency but after completion was renamed to Damansara Residensi. These were constructed on leasehold land during 2005 and 2006 by Genting Citra on a piece of land which was formerly secondary jungle. This new development is a gated community and is located behind SK Damansara Jaya, a national-type primary school.

The demographics of Damansara Jaya are generally considered to be predominantly Chinese and upper middle-class owners.

The latest residential property addition to Damansara Jaya are 4 units of 3-storey bungalows named as Cloverton and were constructed by OCR Land Holdings between 2012 and 2014.

Government 
Damansara Jaya is represented by Damansara parliamentary seat (P.106) in the Parliament of Malaysia. The town is also represented by one state assembly seat – Bandar Utama (N.36) – in the Selangor State Legislative Assembly.

The township is governed by the Petaling Jaya City Council (Majlis Bandaraya Petaling Jaya).

Commerce 
The main commercial development in Damansara Jaya, was the Atria which consisted of freehold land measuring 22,161.02 square meters in area together with a four-level shopping complex annexed with two parking buildings of three levels. Atria, which had been planned to house a cinema, commenced life in the mid-1980s as the Kimisawa and Printemps departmental stores. Between 1984 and 1985, traffic jams were common in Damansara Jaya, mostly during weekends when both Japanese and French stores had sales promotions. They were seen as the "must-visit" shopping complexes in Petaling Jaya, the "less attractive" alternatives being the likes of Asia Jaya, Thrifty Supermarket or Jaya Shopping Complex. The Piccadilly Disco located within the Atria used to be a popular hang-out for teenagers and college students. The disco was famed for its afternoon tea dances and received as much attention for the frequent police raids on the outlet. The economic recession in 1988 saw the eventual closing down of these three establishments. The discothèque with its main entrance at the side of the building has been replaced by other businesses and since 2008, a language centre. Having exited from their brief South East Asian business venture during the 1980s into Malaysia (and Singapore too), Printemps remains as a premier department store in Paris while in Japan, Kimisawa since 2000 has been part of the larger Aeon Group. Aeon Kimisawa was subsequently dissolved upon merger with Maxvalu Tokai on 1 March 2013.

Emerging from the downturn, the Lion Group took over ownership of the complex, whereupon the former Kimisawa location became Parkson Grand and Printemps became the Atria Shopping Centre. In the early 2000s, Atria was taken over by Lien Hoe Corporation and the Parkson supermarket was taken over by Tops, and then, in 2005, by Giant. Later Parkson Grand ceased operations and moved to 1 Utama. The decision by the new owners that more space is required for redevelopment meant that many long established tenants of mini shop-lots (such as Sweet Florist) on the ground floor near the supermarket had to re-locate. In September 2007 Sweet Florist re-opened on the Ground Floor of Atria, near the information counter.

By 2005, it was very evident that the Atria was very far from the league of the newer and larger complexes nearby such as 1 Utama, Ikano Power Centre and The Curve. The main anchor tenant on Level 3, the Popular Bookstore decided to terminate its presence at the Atria. Popular Bookstore had by then established its flagship store at the newly opened Ikano Power Centre and in addition a smaller branch at 1 Utama. The Level 3 location vacated by the Popular Bookstore was soon occupied by the Big Bookshop. Later, the Big Bookshop also operated a permanent book warehouse at the First Floor space that had been occupied by the Parkson Grand department store. By 2011, the Big Bookshop had vacated Level 3 and consolidated store operations together with the book warehouse on the First Floor.

Nevertheless, the Atria continued to be a popular destination among the residents of Damansara Jaya; the main attractions probably being the convenience in access and the general ease in obtaining a parking space. During most weekends, the Atria thus remained an attractive choice in comparison to having to endure the traffic jams and parking inconveniences of the nearby larger complexes at Bandar Utama and at Mutiara Damansara. It is not improbable that since December 2007, the Tropicana City Mall in adjacent Damansara Utama has provided significant competition to the Atria's business.

In March 2007, Lien Hoe sold the Atria at RM 75,000,000 to OSK Property Holdings Berhad. Nevertheless, ground floor stores were still open for business, with the bustling ground floor centre courtyard are still occupied by traders selling items such as books and clothes.

As for shop-lots, Damansara Jaya residents can choose between the 4-storey shops surrounding The Atria or the older 2-storey Mewah shops, i.e. those behind the KDU. More upmarket establishments such as banks (Maybank, RHB Bank and Public Bank), restaurants, pharmacies and clubs are found at the former whereas more traditional businesses such as coffee shops, sundry shops and hardware shops are located at the latter.

Hair care services are provided by various saloons located at the external Atria or Mewah shops or within the Atria Complex. Tyre shops are located at Jalan SS22/25, Jalan SS22/23 and Jalan SS22/21. Car repair and car air-conditioning shops can be found at both the Mewah and Atria shops area. Popular betting shops such as Toto, Magnum and Da Ma Cai also operate at Damansara Jaya.

Redevelopment of the Atria
In January 2009, OSK proposed to redevelop the property into a more upmarket retail and commercial destination for Petaling Jaya folks. The redeveloped modern shopping mall will have gross lettable area of 1.3 million sq ft (121,000 m2)and also some low-rise shop offices. The development order had been obtained in 2008 and the project is expected to kick off in the later part of 2010. The potential gross development value of some 1 billion Ringgit is expected be realised by 2012.

On 14 April 2010, OSK Property executive director and chief executive officer Gerard Tan Boon Chuan mentioned at the company's shareholders meeting that the development order had been endorsed and the redeveloped Atria with a potential gross development value of up to RM1 billion, would feature a four-storey podium and two 18-storey towers. It was also mentioned that there will be an increase in parking facilities with over 2,000 bays available.

The development signage put up in August 2011 indicates that the Atria will be demolished over a 6-months period. The redevelopment will be carried out by Atria Damansara Sdn Bhd and would consist of a four-storey podium and two 16-storey towers. When completed, the podium will have  of retail space for lease and 1,830 parking bays housed in two levels of underground parking and five levels of multi-storey parking. This Atria redevelopment has seen a fair degree of protests from Damansara Jaya residents.

The final phase of Atria redevelopment commenced during the third quarter of 2016. This involves the redevelopment of the two food stalls complex at Jalan SS22/19 and Jalan SS22/25. For this phase, metal hoardings were placed almost in the middle of the road along a section of Jalan SS22/25. This has somewhat restricted traffic flow.

Demolition of the old Atria
On 26 April 2011, OSK gave three months notice to all the Atria tenants to vacate the shopping complex by 26 July 2011. OSK had apparently obtained updated approval from MBPJ to demolish the existing development and to construct in its place 2 x 15 storey office blocks, a 4-storey podium incorporating a shopping mall, 2 levels of underground car park and 4 levels of multi-storey car park. As of 26 July, the Language House remained operating at the Atria. A dispute involving the tenancy agreement between the Language House and OSK was then unresolved. By mid-August, the Atria complex, save for small section as access to the Language House, had essentially been fenced by metal hoardings. The loss of use of both the Atria multi-storey car parks has had significant impact on available street parking bays. By early September, the car park building at the Atria main entrance had been demolished. By mid-October, the other car park building had also been demolished. The demolition of the shopping complex proper begun very soon after the departure of the Language House from its Atria premises on 22 October. The Language House subsequently re-commenced operations at Damansara Intan on 8 November. By Christmas, almost all of the Atria complex building, save perhaps for the facade of the old Parkson entrance had been demolished. That too was gone within the next 2 weeks.

Plan to rebuild a new Atria
On 6 July 2012, OSK Property executive director, Tan Sri Ong Leong Huat, announced that the company has appointed Beijing Urban Construction Group (M) Sdn Bhd as the main contractor for the project. The first phase to be completed will be the four-storey podium shopping mall while the remaining developments are targeted for completion by end 2013. On 28 May 2015, The Atria was reopened and heralded the rebirth of an iconic landmark for Damansara Jaya.

Healthcare
Residents of Damansara Jaya can easily access to general practitioners (Dr Lim at Toh & Lim), child specialist Dr Chan and dental care (such as Au & Kooi Dental Surgery) within this township. Sadly, the other long established Damansara Jaya child specialist, Dr Kwan Poh Woh succumbed to cancer during December 2018. Not too far away is the Thomson Hospital (formerly Tropicana Medical Centre) in Kota Damansara, Damansara Specialist Hospital, located in adjacent Damansara Utama, and BP Specialist Centre Megah (formerly known as Sime Darby Specialist Center, and earlier Megah Medical Specialist Group or MMSG) in the adjacent Taman SEA.

The ALLin and Sibu pharmacies are located at the Atria shops whereas Caring, Watsons and AEON Wellness pharmacies are located within the Atria.

Foh Peng serves as the sole Chinese medical shop for Damansara Jaya. It is located adjacent to the Public Bank on Jalan SS22/23. Just like most other modern medical shops, Foh Peng also carries a fair selection of sundry goods.
 
Pet healthcare is available from Veterinary Clinics located at the Atria as well as Mewah shops.

Education
A variety of educational establishments are located in Damansara Jaya, including kindergartens, primary and secondary public schools, tuition centres, art and music schools and the KDU college.

SMK Damansara Jaya, or Damansara Jaya Secondary School, and also SRK Damansara Jaya or referred as Damansara Jaya Primary School is very popular among residents of Damansara Jaya and its surrounding areas, such as Bandar Utama, Taman Megah, and Taman SEA. Not only does it excel academically, it has also built a strong name for itself in co-curricular activities. A very prominent product of SMK Damansara Jaya is its debate team which, to date, has won ten national inter-school debating titles in the last nine years. These tournaments include the prestigious national Tan Sri Datuk Wira Abdul Rahman Arshad Cup (2001, 2003, 2008), Taylor's College Annual Inter-School Debate competition (2000, 2002, 2005, 2006) and HELP University College's Tan Sri Paduka Dr Saleha Debate Cup (2004, 2006, 2008).

In early 2007, the Itqan Integrated Islamic School commenced operations at a bungalow located at 9 Lorong SS22/32A, to provide tuition and Islamic education. At Itqan, the English and Arabic languages are used as the medium of instruction. Some years ago, this bungalow housed the Aladdin Kindergarten. It had since become dilapidated and remained so until being renovated to house this Islamic school. In November 2013 Itqan ceased operations at Damansara Jaya and relocated to Sungai Penchala. The old Itqan building has since remained unoccupied.

Transportation

Roads 
Damansara Jaya has excellent access to expressways. It is surrounded by the Damansara–Puchong Expressway (LDP) on its east, the Sprint Expressway (SPRINT) on its north and North Klang Valley Expressway (NKVE) on its west. Most roads in Damansara Jaya are single-lane two-way roads.

Petrol stations 
Its motorists are served by one BHPetrol, two Petronas, and one Shell petrol stations. One of these Petronas petrol stations is located along the Damansara-Puchong Expressway, while the other is adjacent to the Mewah shops. The former, previously operated by Nobamech Enterprise, was previously also a main supplier of compressed natural gas for NGV taxis. As an added convenience, a Maybank ATM was added to this Petronas station in early 2007. The BHPetrol petrol station commenced operations in 2006 when Boustead Holdings took over the operations of stations from British Petroleum. The familiar green-based colours of BP were replaced by BHPetrol's orange-yellow. BHPetrol is owned by Boustead Holdings which in turn is majority owned by the Armed Forces Fund Board (LTAT). In the same month, the Petronas petrol station along the Damansara-Puchong Expressway underwent a 3-week renovation and re-opened under new management. In April 2009, this Petronas station stopped selling compressed natural gas (CNG), which has led to the disappearance of the familiar long queue of taxis along Jalan SS22/48. The Shell station, located along Jalan SS24/1, took over a former ProJET station in August 2007. It is operated by Zarahim Enterprise. On December 2015, the station underwent a major renovation and on 2 February 2016, Zarahim Enterprise opened its doors again with a newly converted station and became the first Platinum Shell site in Malaysia. Now it has a full Shell Select store with 3 other integrated stores, which are a Deli2Go, a Boost Juice and a Krispy Kreme.

Public transport 
, public bus services are provided by RapidKL which operates several paid bus routes and the Petaling Jaya City Council which operates the PJ City Bus, a free bus service. These bus routes connect Damansara Jaya to the Klang Valley Integrated Transit System via stops at the Light Rail Transit (LRT) stations of Kelana Jaya and Taman Bahagia, and the Mass Rapid Transit (MRT) station of TTDI.

RapidKL bus route numbers 802, T784, and T813, as well as PJ City Bus route number PJ05 serve Damansara Jaya.

All public transport in Damansara Jaya accept  smart cards.

Resident associations
The Damansara Jaya Residents and Owners Association (DJROA), formed in 1994, represents the interests of a majority of residents in this township. The DJROA had its beginnings in October 1993, when residents grouped together to successfully address local authority plans to have a night market at the then dead-end road of Jalan SS22/43. The association operates a community centre located on Jalan SS22/30. This community centre was officially opened on 15 December 2005 by Dato' Seri Ong Ka Ting, then the Malaysian Minister of Housing and Local Government. Activities such as line dancing and Wai Dan Gong are regularly conducted at the DJROA Community Centre.

The DJROA has participated in the United Nations-sponsored Local Agenda 21 programme under the auspices of the Petaling Jaya City Council.

In November 2009, the DJROA won first prize for the Best Neighbourhood Award from the Petaling Jaya City Council. The DJROA had previously also won first prize in 2001 and were placed second in 2004.

The Damansara Residency Residents Association looks after the interest of residents of the development on Jalan SS22/47A. In 2014, the residents of Jalan SS22/39, Jalan SS22/39A and Jalan SS22/39B established their own independent resident association.

On 5 December 2009, Mr Nik Nazmi Nik Ahmad (then-Seri Setia State Assemblyman and political secretary to the Chief Minister), represented the Chief Minister of Selangor, Tan Sri Abdul Khalid Ibrahim to officially launch Community Policing in Damansara Jaya.

Places of worship
Buddhist Wisdom Centre (Theravada) is located at 14, Jalan SS 22/27a, and it has classes about the Dharma and meditation.

A Sword of the Spirit Charismatic Church is located on the first floor at 11 Jalan SS22/23. An Evangelical Bible Presbyterian Church is located on the ground floor at 26 Jalan SS22/21. The Gospel Lighthouse Pentecostal Church is located on the second floor of at 44 Jalan SS22/25. On 1 November 2009, the New Covenant Church commenced services on the 3rd Floor of the Atria in the space which used to be the rear portion of the Big Bookshop. This church relocated elsewhere at the end of its 12-month tenancy.

Petaling Jaya's only Indian cemetery is situated in Damansara Jaya, next to KDU College.

Prominent business offices
Gamuda Berhad, a KLSE First Board listed company, has its corporate office located on Jalan SS22/21 in Damansara Jaya. Gamuda is principally involved in engineering and construction, infrastructure and township developments. The adjacent Damansara-Puchong Expressway (LDP), was constructed by Gamuda in a joint venture with Irama Duta.

Political representatives

Notable residents
Tan Sri Ong Ka Ting - former Malaysian Minister of Housing and Local Government, former MCA president (May 2003 to October 2008)
Tan Sri Bakri Omar - former Malaysian Inspector-General of Police
Rashid Khalil Mufti - drummer for The Otherside Orchestra & Schloka, freelance drummer for international bands, official ambassador for Hypebeast and Highsnobiety (KL Branch)

External links
   Map

References 

Townships in Selangor